Draconia may refer to:

Taxonomy 
Draconia, a moth genus in the family Thyrididae
A synonym for the plant genus Artemisia

Fiction 
Home planet of the Draconians in the television series Doctor Who
An artificial planet in Menace (video game)
An island in Tibia (video game)
An alien ship in Buck Rogers in the 25th Century (film)
A planet in Buck Rogers in the 25th Century (TV series)

Other 
Racehorse, winner of 1926 Tremont Stakes

See also 
Draconian (disambiguation)